Pullea stutzeri, the Hard Alder is a species of rainforest plant in the ancient family Cunoniaceae. It is endemic to the wet tropics rainforests of northeastern Queensland, Australia.

References

Flora of Queensland
stutzeri
Trees of Australia
Taxa named by Ferdinand von Mueller